The Islamic State – Sinai Province (IS-SP; , al-Dawlah al-Islāmiyah – Wilayah Sīnāʼ)  is a branch of the militant Islamist group Islamic State that is active in the Sinai Peninsula of Egypt.

Islamic State of Iraq and the Levant - Sinai province was known as Ansar Bait al-Maqdis (ABM) which has been part of the Sinai insurgency and has been especially active in the Sinai Peninsula since 2011 after the deterioration of security there, focusing its efforts on Israel and the Arab gas pipeline to Jordan. After former Egyptian President Mohamed Morsi was deposed in the 2013 Egyptian coup d'état, Egypt began a crackdown on jihadist groups in Sinai and elsewhere. ABM and other jihadist groups intensified their campaign of attacks on Egyptian security forces. On 13 November 2014, ABM dissolved its loyalty to Al-Qaeda and pledged allegiance to Abu Bakr al-Baghdadi, the leader of the Islamic State (IS), and adopted the name Sinai Province (Wilayah Sīnāʼ) claiming to be a branch of IS. Al-Baghdadi was killed in October 2019.

It was believed that Abu Osama al-Masri was leader of IS-SP from August 2016 until his death in June 2018, but not much other personal information is available.

In March 2021, it was reported that IS-SP leader, Salim Salma Said Mahmoud al-Hamadin,  was killed during clashes with Egyptian and Bedouin forces near Al-Barth, south of Rafah.

As of the beginning of 2023, the group has been very inactive due to the heavy operations against IS-SP by the Egyptian Army and Sinai Tribes Union.

Background
During 2014, Ansar Bait al-Maqdis (ABM) sent emissaries to IS in Syria to seek financial support, weapons and tactical advice. On 10 November 2014, many members of ABM took an oath of allegiance to Abu Bakr al-Baghdadi, the leader of IS. It adopted the name Sinai Province and has since carried out attacks, mostly in North Sinai, but also in other parts of Egypt.  Security officials say militants based in Libya have established ties with Sinai Province.

Attacks and other activities

The group has killed hundreds of Egyptian security personnel, and has also been responsible for attacks on civilians, including the killing of Croatian engineer Tomislav Salopek, in August 2015.
 On 1 July 2015, the group launched a large scale assault in and around the Sinai town of Sheikh Zuweid, eventually being driven back by Egyptian security forces after at least 100 militants and 17 soldiers were killed in the fighting. According to Brian Fishman of the New America Foundation, the tactics used by the attackers - suicide bombers backed up by direct and indirect fire, mortar fire in combination with small arms, and simultaneous assaults in multiple locations — suggested a transfer of knowledge from IS fighters in Iraq and Syria.
 The group claimed to have shot three Grad rockets on 3 July 2015 from Sinai to southern Israel near the Gaza Strip. Two rocket hits were confirmed in Eshkol, which did not result in any injury or property damage. Israel did not respond to the attack.
 On 16 July 2015, the group claimed responsibility for a rocket attack on an Egyptian Navy patrol boat on the north coast of Sinai, close to the Gaza Strip.
 The group claimed responsibility for bringing down Russian aircraft Metrojet Flight 9268, carrying 224 passengers. It was flying to Saint Petersburg from Sharm el-Sheikh on 31 October 2015, when it broke up over Hasna (Egypt), killing all on board. Data obtained from the airplane black boxes gives credence to the theory that there was a bomb attack. On 17 November 2015, Russian President Vladimir Putin confirmed that a bomb attack brought down the aircraft.
 One of the group's leaders, Ashraf Ali Hassanein Gharabali, was shot and killed in a shoot-out with Egyptian security forces in Cairo on 10 November 2015. The Egyptian Interior Ministry linked Gharabali to a string of attacks including an assassination attempt on the Interior Minister.
 The group claimed responsibility for an attack on the Arab gas pipeline on 7 January 2016.
 In December 2016, the group revealed the name of its governor or wali (leader) to be Abu Hajar al-Hashemi.
 In February 2017, IS-linked operatives launched four Grad rockets from Egyptian territory in Sinai peninsula on the Israeli southernmost city of Eilat, prompting the Israeli Iron Dome system to intercept three of the rockets, with no physical casualties or damage reported, though 11 civilians were brought to hospital to be treated for shock.
 In March 2017, the group released a video titled "The Light of the Islamic Law", in which they were shown blowing up Egyptian patrols, destroying TV sets, desecrating and detonating graves, executing prisoners and captured Egyptian soldiers, and  beheading two old men (one an elder who voiced opposition to IS, and the other a street magician performer).
 It was reported on 21 April 2017 that an Egyptian air raid killed 19 IS fighters, including three unnamed leaders.
 On July 7, ISIL-Sinai Province militants encircled and ambushed an Egyptian military base in Rafah known as el Barth, 20 Egyptian troops were killed (including colonel Ahmed Mansi) and 3 others wounded. 46 ISIL-Sinai province militants were killed with the loss of 6 vehicles. Most of the base was demolished after a suicidal car bomb.
 On 24 November 2017, In the Bir al-Abed attack jihadists killed 311 people and injured at least 122.
 On 19 December 2017, one officer was killed and two were injured in a failed assassination attempt on the Minister of Interior Magdi Abdel-Ghaffar and the minister of defense Sedki Sobhy.
 On 29 December 2017, 11 were killed in the attack on Saint Menas church in Helwan (south of Cairo).

On 8 May 2022, ten soldiers and one officer were killed during an attack at a checkpoint at a water pumping station in El Qantara.

In August 2022, videos and photographs were circulated over social media, showing how the army-affiliated militias executed three shackled or wounded men in custody. The executions were extrajudicial. Human Rights Watch called for the Egyptian authorities to immediately open a “transparent and impartial investigation” into the violations.

In November 18 2022, dozens of IS fighters clashed with the Egyptian army on a government building in Al-Ismailia, in which resulted in killing and wounding 6 members of the Egyptian army and an airstrike on IS fighters.

In December 1 2022, IS soldiers killed and wounded 6 members of the Egyptian police in Al-Ismailia governorate.

In December 31 2022, two gunmen killed and wounded 15 of the Egyptian police in Al-Ismailia governorate.

See also
 Islamic State of Iraq and the Levant – Algeria Province
 Islamic State of Iraq and the Levant – Caucasus Province
 Sinai insurgency
 Ansar Bait al-Maqdis

References

External links
 Michael Shkolnik, From Marriage of Convenience to Bitter Divorce: The Unraveling Ties Between Hamas and the Islamic State's Sinai Affiliate, January 22, 2018

Factions of the Islamic State of Iraq and the Levant
Islamic State of Iraq and the Levant in Egypt
Jihadist groups in Egypt
Organisations of the Egyptian Crisis (2011–2014)
Organizations based in Asia designated as terrorist
Organizations designated as terrorist by Canada
Organizations designated as terrorist by Malaysia
Organisations designated as terrorist by New Zealand

Qutbist organisations
Salafi Jihadist groups